Bertil Stridh (1931-2013) was an international speedway rider from Sweden.

Speedway career 
Stridh won the gold medal at the European Longtrack Championship in the 1962 Individual Long Track European Championship and 1963 Individual Long Track European Championship.

References 

1931 births
2013 deaths
Swedish speedway riders